Bill Hickey (born June 16, 1936) is an American bobsledder. He competed at the 1964 Winter Olympics and the 1968 Winter Olympics.

References

1936 births
Living people
American male bobsledders
Olympic bobsledders of the United States
Bobsledders at the 1964 Winter Olympics
Bobsledders at the 1968 Winter Olympics
People from Keene, New York